The 2006 GP Ouest-France, the 70th edition of the GP Ouest-France, took place on August 27, 2006 in the French region of Brittany, in a race in and around the village of Plouay.

Previously unheralded Vincenzo Nibali stunned the field with his victory, outsprinting Juan Antonio Flecha to take his first major win.

General Standings

References

External links
Race website

2006 UCI ProTour
2006
2006 in French sport